Nahuel Lobo (born 27 August 1991) is an Argentine rugby union footballer. He currently plays for Montpellier in the Top 14. He also plays for the Argentina national team, Los Pumas. His usual position is Prop.

He made his international debut on 17 November 2012 in a 39–22 defeat against France in Lille.

References

External links 
itsrugby.co.uk Player Statistics

1991 births
Argentine rugby union players
Montpellier Hérault Rugby players
Pampas XV players
Living people
Rugby union props
Expatriate rugby union players in France
Argentine expatriate rugby union players
Argentine expatriate sportspeople in France
Expatriate rugby union players in England
Argentine expatriate sportspeople in England
Argentina international rugby union players
Sportspeople from Entre Ríos Province